The Rollercoaster Tour was a 1992 co-headlining concert tour by the Scottish noise pop band the Jesus and Mary Chain, the Irish-English alternative rock band My Bloody Valentine, the English Britpop band Blur and the American indie rock band Dinosaur Jr. A two-leg 34-date tour of the United Kingdom and North America, the U.K. tour was in support of all four bands' current releases: Blur's first album Leisure (1991), Dinosaur Jr.s fourth album Green Mind (1991), My Bloody Valentine's second album Loveless (1991) and The Jesus and Mary Chain's fourth album Honey's Dead (1992).

The tour was curated by the Jesus and Mary Chain's vocalist Jim Reid, who "wanted to break the routine" of performing in small, frequently played venues — such as Rock City in Nottingham — and "cater to all strands of independent rock music". Reid was inspired by, and considered the Rollercoaster Tour a British equivalent to, the North American festival Lollapalooza, at which the Jesus and Mary Chain performed at in 1991 and which he considered "fairly disastrous". Each band performed a 45-minute set with no encore and the line-up changed each night of the tour, although the Jesus and Mary Chain performed as the final act on all 11 dates.

My Bloody Valentine ceased live performances in the UK after the tour and did not play again until their 2008 reunion tour. The band's set, which ended with the white noise section of their song "You Made Me Realise",  reportedly caused attendees' pint glasses to fall out of their hands due to excessive sound pressure levels. Reflecting on the tour, Jim Reid referred to it as "a lot [like a] competition — who could be the loudest? Whose was the best film show? And then there was, who could be most off their tits and still play a show?" The Rollercoaster EP, containing material from Blur, My Bloody Valentine, Dinosaur Jr. and the Jesus and Mary Chain, was issued in Melody Maker in March 1992 to promote the tour.

The North American leg of the tour took place in fall 1992 and featured the Jesus and Mary Chain, Curve and Spiritualized.

Tour dates

Rollercoaster EP

The Rollercoaster EP is an extended play which was distributed free in a March 1992 issue of Melody Maker in support of the Rollercoaster Tour. It includes four songs, which are individual tracks from Blur's second album Modern Life is Rubbish (1993), My Bloody Valentine's second album Loveless (1991), the Jesus and Mary Chain's fourth album Honey's Dead (1992) and a live version of a song from Dinosaur Jr.'s third album Bug (1987).

References

Bibliography

 

1992 concert tours
Co-headlining concert tours
Blur (band)
My Bloody Valentine (band)
The Jesus and Mary Chain